Mauricio Weber (born 26 October 1982) is a Uruguayan football player that currently plays for F.C. Motagua in Liga Nacional de Fútbol de Honduras. He previously played for C.A. Rentistas, Rampla Juniors, Instituto de Córdoba, Santiago Morning and C.D. Victoria.

External links
Interview with Mauricio Weber

1982 births
Living people
Uruguayan people of German descent
Footballers from Montevideo
Uruguayan footballers
Rampla Juniors players
Instituto footballers
C.D. Victoria players
F.C. Motagua players
Expatriate footballers in Argentina
Expatriate footballers in Chile
Expatriate footballers in Honduras
Liga Nacional de Fútbol Profesional de Honduras players

Association football midfielders